Ning Wanqi (born March 29, 2000) is a Chinese ice dancer.  With her skating partner, Wang Chao, she is the 2020 Cup of China bronze medalist, a three-time Chinese national bronze medalist (2018–20), and competed in the final segment at two Four Continents Championships (2019, 2020).

Programs

With Wang

Competitive highlights 
GP: Grand Prix; CS: Challenger Series; JGP: Junior Grand Prix

 With Wang

 Ladies' singles

References

External links 
 

2000 births
Living people
Chinese female ice dancers
Figure skaters from Heilongjiang
Sportspeople from Qiqihar